Ivand (also Romanized as Īvand; also known as Uvand) is a village in Rudqat Rural District, Sufian District, Shabestar County, East Azerbaijan Province, Iran. At the 2006 census, its population was 1,312, in 328 families.

References 

Populated places in Shabestar County